Israel Beck (1891–1972) was a founding member of the Antwerpsche Diamantkring, the world's largest and first-ever diamond bourse to be dedicated to rough diamonds trade. He was President of the Board from 1961 until his death in 1972. By that time, he had served benevolently 43 years as a member of the Board, promoting diamond trade internationally and the Antwerp diamond industry in particular, and representing the Antwerpsche Diamantkring at the World Diamond Congress.

Early life
Beck was born in 1891 in Sanok, southern Poland (a region which was known as Galicia). He married Helena Blitz, with whom he had three children (Isaac, Edith, and Leopold). In 1907 he joined his future father in law, Louis (Levie) Blitz, to become the third generation of family members in the diamond trade.

Between World War I and World War II
Beck co-founded the Antwerpsche Diamantkring, and became in 1929 a member of its first Board of Directors immediately upon its establishment as the first diamond bourse worldwide for rough diamond trade. By 1932 he opened a new diamond factory with his brother, in the center of the diamond district in Antwerp.

During World War II
Beck and his family fled Belgium during World War II, crossing France and finding shelter during the final years of the war as refugees in Geneva, Switzerland.

After World War II
The diamond industry in Antwerp had to recover from the many human losses that were suffered during the Second World War. After the war, Beck returned to Antwerp and benevolently dedicated much of his time and attention to the rebuilding of Antwerp's diamond trade and the industry.
In 1957 he became Vice-president of the Board of the Antwerpsche Diamantkring, and in 1961 he was elected President of the Board.

Memberships to other Boards of directors
 Vice-president of the World Federation of Diamond Bourses
 National Board member at the Syndicate of the Belgian Diamond Industry
 Board member of the Diamantexpo
 Board member of the Diamond Office

Honors and awards
 Knight of the Order of Leopold II, appointed by his Majesty King Baudouin of Belgium on January 4, 1955, in recognition of the services rendered to the Kingdom of Belgium and in particular for the development of the diamonds trade in Antwerp.
 Honorary distinction granted on 19 November 1968 by the Diamantexpo for his contributions to the industry as Board member

Subsequent family members to enter the diamond business
Israel Beck's two sons Isaac and Leopold Beck joined the family business, becoming the fourth generation of diamond traders. Leopold Beck has been heading Beck Diamonds in Antwerp since 1972. Leopold Beck's two sons became the fifth generation of diamond traders in the family: Axel Beck joined Beck Diamonds in 1995, whereas Raoul Beck joined in 1997 and heads DiamAlps in Switzerland, and Hauthentic Jewellery in Switzerland.

References

External links
 World Diamond Congress, World Federation of Diamond Bourses
 Beck Diamonds
 DiamAlps
 Hauthentic Jewellery

1891 births
1972 deaths
20th-century Belgian businesspeople
Knights of the Order of Leopold II